Set Phyo Wai (born 1 December 1994) is a footballer from Burma, and a midfielder for the Myanmar U-23 football team and Yangon United FC. In 2014, Set Phyo Wai transferred to Magwe. Currently he plays main role at Shan United.

Honor
2016 General Aung San Shield Champion
 2017 MNL Champions
 2018 MFF Charity Cup Champions
 2019 MNL Champions
 2020 MFF Charity Cup Champions

References

1994 births
Living people
Sportspeople from Yangon
Burmese footballers
Myanmar international footballers
Association football forwards
Yangon United F.C. players